Van Essen is a Dutch toponymic surname, meaning "from Essen". It may refer to:

People 
 Arthur van Essen (born 1938), Dutch linguist
 David Van Essen (born 1945), American neuroscientist
 Frank van Essen (born 1967), Dutch drummer and violinist
 Gerard van Essen (1924–1997), Dutch clown
 Henk van Essen (born 1960), Dutch policeman
 Jan van Essen (c.1640–1684), Flemish landscape painter
 Jörg van Essen (born 1947), German politician
 Karin van Essen-Moos (born 1961), Dutch tennis player
 Kevin van Essen (born 1989), Dutch football player
 Sharon van Essen (born 1981), Dutch cyclist 
 Tamsin van Essen, English ceramicist

Dutch-language surnames